Ed Blaney (born April 20, 1951) is a retired American soccer defender who played professionally in the American Soccer League and Major Indoor Soccer League.

In 1969, Blaney graduated from Northeast Catholic High School.  He attended Saint Joseph's University playing on the men’s soccer team from 1969 to 1972.  On June 13, 1973, Blaney turned professional with the Philadelphia Spartans of the American Soccer League.  In 1978, he played for the New Jersey Americans before moving indoors with the Philadelphia Fever of the Major Indoor Soccer League.

References

External links
 MISL stats
 Philadelphia Fever: Ed Blaney

Living people
1951 births
Soccer players from Philadelphia
American soccer players
American Soccer League (1933–1983) players
Major Indoor Soccer League (1978–1992) players
New Jersey Americans (ASL) players
Philadelphia Fever (MISL) players
Philadelphia Spartans players
Association football defenders